Plunderer is a Japanese anime series adapted by Geek Toys from the manga series of the same name written by written and illustrated by Suu Minazuki. The series premiered from January 8 to June 24, 2020. From episodes 1–11, the opening theme is "Plunderer" by Miku Itō while the ending theme is "Countless Days" by Rina Honnizumi. From episodes 12–24, the second opening theme is "Kokou no Hikari Lonely dark" by Itō Miku while the second ending theme is "Reason of Life" by Honnizumi Rina, Ozawa Ari, and Itō Shizuka.

Funimation acquired the series for distribution, and streamed the series on FunimationNow in English speaking regions, and on AnimeLab in Australia and New Zealand. Funimation premiered the first two episodes of the series on YouTube in the United Kingdom, Ireland, Australia and New Zealand on December 8, 2019.

Episode list

Notes

References

External links
  
 

Plunderer